Liv, stylized as liv, is a Swedish/American supergroup consisting of musicians Lykke Li, Andrew Wyatt and Pontus Winnberg of Miike Snow, Björn Yttling of Peter Bjorn and John, and Jeff Bhasker formed in 2016. Liv is the Swedish word for "life". Lykke Li described the band as "the love child of ABBA and Fleetwood Mac." All band members are part of the Swedish artist collective Ingrid, which they spearheaded in 2012.

The band made their first appearance in April 2016 at a private party in Los Angeles. Their second appearance was at the Spotify Symposium conference in Stockholm, Sweden on June 10, 2016.

The band's debut single, "Wings of Love" was released on September 30, 2016. A music video for the song was uploaded to YouTube on October 12, 2016. The band released a second song, "Dream Awake" on November 11, 2016. On June 9, 2017, they released a third single, "Heaven". On September 22, 2017, they released their fourth single "Hurts to Liv".

Discography

Singles
 "Wings of Love" (2016)
 "Dream Awake" (2016)
 "Heaven" (2017)
 "Hurts to Liv" (2017)

References

Musical groups established in 2016
Swedish musical groups
American alternative rock groups
Miike Snow